A cloth hall or linen hall is a historic building located in the centre of the main marketplace of a European town. Cloth halls were built from medieval times into the 18th century.

A cloth hall contained trading stalls for the sale, particularly, of cloth but also of leather, wax, salt, and exotic imports such as silks and spices.

Poland 
In Poland, the most famous existing cloth-hall building is Kraków's Cloth Hall (Sukiennice), rebuilt in 1555 in Renaissance style. 
The 14th-century Gothic cloth hall in Toruń is preserved as part of the Old Town Market Hall. 

Cloth halls formerly also existed in Poznań, at the Old Market Square; and in Wrocław, at the site of the street now called ulica Sukiennice (Cloth-Hall Street).

Germany
Examples of German Gewandhäuser can be found in the towns of Brunswick, Zwickau, and Leipzig. 

The rebuilt, third Leipzig Gewandhaus is home to the Leipzig Gewandhaus Orchestra.

Belgium and Netherlands 
The former Cloth Hall in Leiden, Netherlands, has, since the 19th century, housed the Stedelijk Museum De Lakenhal (Municipal Cloth-Hall Museum) of art.

Examples of cloth halls in Belgium include the Ypres Cloth Hall and cloth halls in Bruges, Leuven, and Tournai. Leuven's Linen-Hall is in an early-Gothic style, with baroque addition, and now serves as the Leuven University Hall.

Britain and Ireland 
British examples are Drapers' Hall, London; the Piece Hall, Halifax; and Leeds' White Cloth Hall. 

In Ireland, the Dublin Linen Hall was completed in 1728, and later White Linen Hall was constructed in Belfast, and there were linen halls in other towns such as Castlebar and Clonakilty.

Notes and references 

Commercial buildings